Housing Development and Infrastructure Limited, doing business as HDIL, is an Indian real estate development company based in Mumbai. 

HDIL's business focuses on Real Estate Development, including construction and development of residential projects and, more recently, commercial and retail projects, Slum Rehabilitation and Development, including clearing slum land and rehousing slum dwellers, and Land Development, including development of infrastructure on land which the company then sells to other property developers. HDIL has an integrated in-house development team which covers all opment from project identification and inception through construction to completion and sale.

Home-buyers of HDIL have recently filed a plea in National Company Law Appellate Tribunal as they have been affected by the delay of the Nahur project.

History 
HDIL also have constructed an additional  of rehabilitation housing area under slum rehabilitation schemes.

HDIL's residential projects generally comprise groups of apartments, towers or larger multi-purpose "township" projects in which individual housing units are sold to customers. The commercial projects are a mix of office space and multiplex cinemas. The retail projects focus on shopping malls. They usually follow a "build and sell" model for the properties they develop.

HDIL also undertakes slum rehabilitation projects under a Government scheme administered by the Slum Rehabilitation Authority (SRA), whereby developers are granted development rights in exchange for clearing and redeveloping slum lands, including providing replacement housing for the dislocated slum dwellers.

Although historically HDIL has focused on real estate development in the Mumbai Metropolitan Region, as part of their growth strategy they are considering projects in other locations, including Kochi and Hyderabad. They also are considering expanding into hotel projects, special economic zone(SEZ) developments and "mega-structure" complexes, which are large-scale mixed-use retail, commercial and residential developments.

In 2020, the Mumbai Police filed a case against the former bank management and promoters of HDIL in the Punjab and Maharashtra Cooperative Bank (PMC Bank) case and said a special investigation team will be probing the case. The bank's former chairman Waryam Singh, managing director Joy Thomas and other senior officials, along with the director of HDIL, Wadhawan, have been named in the FIR. Explaining the modus operandi of the case, the FIR said HDIL promoters allegedly colluded with the bank management, to draw loans from the bank's Bhandup branch.

Operations

HDIL's turnover from sales of projects, developed land and land development rights for the financial years ended 31 March 2008, 2007, 2006  were Rs. 2380 crore, Rs. 1204 crore, Rs. 434 crore, respectively, and the restated profit after tax for financial years ended 31 March 2008, 2007 and 2006 were Rs. 1409 crore, Rs. 743 crore and Rs. 1,172 crore respectively.
HDIL launched an IPO in July 2007 and is currently listed on the Bombay Stock Exchange (BSE) and the National Stock Exchange (NSE).

References

Construction and civil engineering companies of India
Construction and civil engineering companies established in 1996
Real estate companies established in 1996
Indian companies established in 1996
Companies listed on the National Stock Exchange of India
Companies listed on the Bombay Stock Exchange